Jolmete is a village in the Cacheu Region of northwestern Guinea-Bissau, to the south of the Cacheu River.

References

External links
Maplandia World Gazetteer

Populated places in Guinea-Bissau
Cacheu Region